Rakthakanda Swamy Temple, Omallur, Pathanamthitta District, known as "Omallur Temple" traces its history to 8th century AD. It is a pilgrim centre on the way to Sabarimala from Pandalam, the birthplace of Sree Ayyappan. The Temple is famous for its annual festival of 10 days in the month of Medom of Malayalam Era. The 10-day festival is celebrated by 10 Karayogams (village communities) in and around Omallur. During the festival days, there is a customary Arattu procession to the river Achenkovil. More than 10 elephants decorated with Nettipattom (a decorated cover on the forehead) will be a speciality of this Arattu. The Temple has a Golden Flag Staff erected in the year 1952 AD. Omallur Temple has many interesting stone carvings. Kallunadasvaram (Nadasvaram  made up of stone) and Kalchangala (chain made by stone) are two among them.

History 
The History of the temple is related to the village named Kalleli near to the konni Town. From the kalleli, the main deity was thrown to the river achankovil by the local people due to there failure in the game Choothu (traditional game played by the kerala people).

See also
 Omalloor
 Temples of Kerala
 Pathanamthitta District

Image gallery

External links

 Omalloor Rektha Kanda Swamy Temple

Reference

Hindu temples in Pathanamthitta district